C.I.Y.M.S. Cricket Club is a cricket club in Belfast, Northern Ireland, playing in the NCU Premier League. C.I.Y.M.S. is an acronym for Church of Ireland Young Men's Society, a body initially established for young men belonging to the Church of Ireland, but the society is now open to men and women of all religions and denominations.

Honours

Irish Senior Cup: 1
2022
NCU Senior League: 3
2012, 2018, 2019
NCU Challenge Cup: 5
2015, 2017, 2019, 2021, 2022
NCU Junior Cup: 2
1968, 1991

See also
C.I.Y.M.S. R.F.C.

References

External links
CI Cricket Club Official Site

Sports clubs in Belfast
Cricket clubs in Northern Ireland
Cricket clubs in County Down